Russian Federation Today (transliteration: Rossiyskaya Federatsiya Segodnya or Rossijskaja Federacija Segodnja) is a Russian language semi-monthly magazine currently published by the Russian Federation Today Autonomous Nonprofit Organization.

History and profile
Russian Federation Today has been published since 1926. Founded by the Federal Assembly (Parliament of the Russian Federation), State Duma of the Federal Council, as well as regional legislative bodies and Russian local authorities’ activities.

References

External links
Russian Federation Today website

Magazines established in 1926
Russian-language magazines
Political magazines published in Russia
Magazines published in the Soviet Union
1926 establishments in the Soviet Union
Semimonthly magazines
Legal magazines